Jennifer Lame is an American film editor best known for her work on Noah Baumbach's films. Lame is also notable for her work on Manchester by the Sea, Hereditary, Tenet, Black Panther: Wakanda Forever, and Oppenheimer.

Career
Jennifer Lame started editing films with Price Check. She has become a recurring collaborator on Noah Baumbach's films including Frances Ha, While We're Young, Mistress America, The Meyerowitz Stories, and Marriage Story. She also edited Paper Towns, Manchester by the Sea, Tyrel, Hereditary, Midsommar, Tenet, Black Panther: Wakanda Forever, and Oppenheimer.

Filmography

Film

Television

References

External links

American film editors
American women film editors
Living people
Place of birth missing (living people)
Year of birth missing (living people)
21st-century American women